Lamu-Garissa-Isiolo Road, is a road in Kenya, and is part of the Lamu-Garissa-Isiolo-Lokichar Road, which itself is a component of the Lamu Port and Lamu-Southern Sudan-Ethiopia Transport Corridor (LAPSSET) Project.

Location
The road starts in the port city of Lamu and proceeds in a northwesterly direction through the town of Bura, Tana River County, (not to be confused with Bura, Garissa County) and continue on to the town of Garissa. At Garissa, the road continues its northwesterly direction to Mado Gashi. The approximate coordinates of the road, immediately north of the town of Garissa are:0°22'14.0"S, 39°42'37.0"E (Latitude:-0.370556; Longitude: 39.710278).

Overview
This road is part of Lapsset corridor highway project. At Isiolo, this road  links with the Isiolo-Lokichar Road, which is also planned. The road the joins with the existing Eldoret-Juba Highway, which will lead to the border with South Sudan. Also at Isiolo the Lamu-Garissa-Isiolo Road will connect with the planned Isiolo-Moyale Road leading to the border with Ethiopia at Moyale.

In October 2016, a consortium of lenders, led by the Development Bank of South Africa agreed to lend the estimated Kenya Sh:71 billion (about US$700 million), needed to construct this road.

Urban centres
The following urban centres lie along the route of the planned Lamu–Garissa–Isiolo Road: (1) Lamu Port (2) Bura, Garrisa, Kachiuru and Ndumuru in Meru County, Mado Gashi, El Dera, Gaba Tula and Isiolo.

Intersections
These are the major intersections along this road: (1) The Mombasa–Garissa Road at Garissa (2) The Thika–Liboi Road at Garissa (3) The Garissa–Nuno–Modogashe–Wajir Road at Garissa (4) The Isiolo-Mandera Road at Mado Gashi.

Intersections with planned roads include: (1) The Isiolo-Lokichar Road at Isiolo and (2) The Isiolo-Moyale Road also at Isiolo.

See also
Trans-African Highway network
List of roads in Kenya

References

External links
Website of LAPSSET Corridor Development Authority (LCDA) 

Roads in Kenya
Lamu
Lamu County
Tana River County
Garissa County
Isiolo County